Ferrovial, S.A., previously Grupo Ferrovial, is a Spanish multinational company that operates in the infrastructure sector for transportation and mobility with four divisions: Highways, Airports, Construction, and Mobility and Energy Infrastructure.  The Highway sector develops, finances, and operates tolls on highways such as the 407 ETR, the North Tarrant Express, the LBJ Express, Euroscut Azores, I-66, I-77, NTE35W, and Ausol I. The Airports sector operates at Heathrow, Glasgow, Aberdeen, and Southampton. The Construction business designs and carries out public and private works such as roads, highways, airports, and buildings. The Mobility and Energy Infrastructure Department is responsible for managing renewable energy, sustainable mobility, and circular economy projects. Ferrovial is present in more than 20 countries where its business lines operate.

In 2021, Ferrovial Services' infrastructure services area in Spain was sold to Portobello and the closing of the sale of its Environmental business in Spain and Portugal was signed in an agreement with PreZero, a Schwarz Group company.

History

20th century 
Ferrovial was founded by Rafael del Pino y Moreno in 1952 as a company focused on railway construction. Its first works consisted of the renovation of tracks for Renfe and operating railroad tie sleeper workshops.

It receives its first international project in 1954: a railway project in Venezuela, and in 1956, it renovated the railway between Bilbao and Portugalete.

In the 60's, Ferrovial focused on the road market through the Redia Plan11 and the concession of the Bilbao-Behobia Highway, the first toll road tendered with private financing and management in Spain.

The company expanded in the early years of the new millennium by acquiring 58.5% of Polish construction company Budimex Dromex S.A. in April 2000

In 1974, it obtained its second concession in Spain, the Burgos-Armiñón highway, which linked Burgos with Bilbao and the French border of Behobia. The 1970s came to a close with the award of a construction project on 700 kilometers of roads in Libya, and its construction was completed in 1986.

In 1985, Ferrovial acquired Cadagua, an engineering and construction company for Water Treatment and Purification Plants established in 1971. It was also awarded construction of the High-Speed Train between Madrid and Seville, as well as numerous infrastructure projects for the Olympic Games in Barcelona and the World Expo of Seville in 1992.

That same year saw the appointment of Rafael del Pino Calvo-Sotelo as CEO, who began a strategic reorganization of the company.

In 1995, Ferrovial acquired the construction company Agroman founded in 1927, which it returned to record profits three years later. In 1997, construction began on the Guggenheim Museum of Modern and Contemporary Art in Bilbao, where Ferrovial implemented a pioneering Environmental Management System in the European structure.

In 1999, Ferrovial went public and integrated all its construction activity into Ferrovial Agroman. Following the founder's retirement in 2000, his son, Rafael del Pino Calvo-Sotelo, became Chair. That same year, Ferrovial took over Budimex, currently the leading Polish construction company in terms of turnover and market capitalization.

It was also awarded the Highway 407 ETR concession in Toronto, Canada.

21st century 
By following the internationalization and diversification strategy, Ferrovial acquired a 20% share in the Sydney Airport in the airport sector in 2002.

Similarly, it acquired two urban services companies in 2003: the British company Amey and Spanish company Cespa. The concessionaire Cintra went public in 2004, and in 2005, Ferrovial acquired the handling company Swissport and the Texan construction company Webber.

In 2006, the company bought the British airport operator BAA and through this operation, it came to manage seven airports in the United Kingdom: Heathrow, Gatwick, Stansted, Glasgow, Edinburgh, Aberdeen, and Southampton, and it took ownership of shares and managing the Budapest Airport in Hungary, the Naples Airport in Italy, and the Melbourne airport in Australia. In 2006, Cintra also obtained the concession for operating the Indiana Toll Road turnpike. and signed an agreement with the Texas Department of Transportation to build and manage Segments 5 and 6 of the SH-130 Turnpike, both of which are in the  US.

In 2007, Ferrovial sold the Budapest airport, as well as its holdings in the Australian airports in Sydney, Melbourne, Launceston, Perth, and three airports in the Northern Territory. It also started to concentrate its airport business in the UK. That year, Cintra signed a contract for the construction and operation of the Central Greece Toll Highway (E65), and Amey was chosen by Network Rail (the UK's rail infrastructure manager) as one of its three exclusive providers for Britain's National Rail track renovation services.

In 2008, the Montabliz viaduct, the highest aqueduct in Spain, was inaugurated and connected Cantabria and the plateau by road. A year later, Cintra was awarded the construction, maintenance, and operation of the North Tarrant Express Highway in Texas in the US. At the end of 2009, the company absorbed the highway management company Cintra; it was awarded maintenance and management of the LBJ Express Texan highway; it changed its corporate name to Ferrovial S.A.; and it sold the Gatwick airport for €1.659 billion, according to the British Competition Commission's indications, which opened a file at the end of 2008 for alleged monopoly.

In 2009, the company was reunited under a new logo and brand image, with yellow and white establishing its hallmark. Several designs had been used before then, such as black letters on a yellow background which can still be seen on some old signs.

In 2010, Ferrovial made several divestments in accordance with its asset rotation policy, which meant its departure from Swissport. Through BAA, it announced the sale of its stake in Airport Property Partnership and the Naples Airport. Likewise, Ferrovial, sold all its shares in Tube Lines (concessionaire of three London Underground lines) through Amey; signed an agreement for the construction of Heathrow Terminal 2 in London; and sold 60% of Cintra Chile.

A year later in 2011, it sold 5.88% of BAA. In addition, it announced the sale of the Edinburgh Airport, per the decision of the British Competition Commission. In that same year, the company was also awarded a new construction section of the Crossrail including Farringdon Station, as part of the project to build a fast railway connection passing through the city of London's underground. It had previously been awarded the construction of two tunnels between Royal Oak and Farringdon and the accesses and bays at the Bond Street and Tottenham Court Road stations. The company closed 2011 with a debt of €5.171 billion, one of the lowest in the sector, and it has one of the most international portfolios.

In August 2012, Ferrovial announced the sale of 10.6% of BAA to Qatar Holding for €607 million, retaining a 39.37% stake in the UK airports manager following the deal. In October of the same year, 5.2% of Heathrow Airports Holding was sold for €319.3 million to the firm CIC International.

In 2014, the international trading company Ferrovial International was created. It was based in Spain and aimed to combine the company's active concessions, services, and construction abroad to participate in bids and thus be awarded new contracts. That same year, the company reduced its stake in Heathrow Airport by up to 25% after selling the pension fund for universities and other British educational institutions; this was 8.65% of its shares in the parent company. With a contract to build an urban road in Saudi Arabia for €145 million, Ferrovial strengthened its presence in the Middle East.

In 2015, it purchased 3 British airports (Aberdeen, Glasgow, and Southampton), for about €1.3 billion; it also strengthened its presence in the United Kingdom, where it was already a leader in services. In addition, the central section of the Thames Tideway Tunnel was awarded in consortium with Laing O'Rourke.

In 2016, Ferrovial expanded the 407 ETR in Toronto, Canada, which is considered the biggest highway in the world at 108 kilometers long and more than 200 entrance and exit points. In addition, it signed a contract to manage and renovate the largest and fifth busiest airport in the United States: Denver International Airport. It purchased the waste treatment company Biotran, strengthening its presence in the industrial services market. That same year, and for the fifteenth consecutive year, it appeared on the Dow Jones Sustainability Index (DJSI) and was the only Spanish company in the sector in the global and European index. Moreover, Ferrovial acquired Broadspectrum in May 2016. On June 30, 2018, it closed the sale of this company to Ventia.

The company earned €376 million in 2016. Sales increased by 11% to €10.759 billion, and the Gross Operating Income (GOI) amounted to €944 million.

At the end of the decade, in 2017, Ferrovial entered the urban mobility business by working with Renault to launch the carsharing operator Zity in Madrid. In 2018, the company launched Wondo, a Mobility as a Service start-up to provide residents access to the main urban mobility services in Madrid. In 2021, it finalized the sale of Wondo to the Finnish company MaaS Global.

In the town of El Salado, Colombia, the company delivered a new water system as part of the Social Infrastructures program: an aqueduct that is energetically powered by a solar panel facility, making it unique in the country. To spread the word about this project, the company worked with local artists to release  a graphic novel as part of the campaign "Water for peace."

Ignacio Madridejos was appointed as the new CEO of the company in 2019. The sale of Broad spectrum to Ventia for €303 million of Equity Value was also announced. The RiverLinx consortium, which Ferrovial participates in, was chosen to manage the Silvertown Tunnel in London.

The start of the new '20s were marked by the fight against COVID-19. The company established the "Ferrovial Together COVID-19" fund, through which it donated €8.7 million to fight the pandemic through social, health-related, and research spheres. In October 2021, Ferrovial launched its new Energy Infrastructure and Mobility business unit. That year, the divestment of the Services business unit also began with the sale of its Environmental business in Spain and Portugal to PreZero. The company was awarded the construction of a section of the Sydney Metro for €1.240 billion. In the field of innovation, Ferrovial launched the AIVIA initiative for developing the 5G roads of the future; it renewed its agreement with MIT for another five years and with Lilium for developing a network of more than 10 vertiports in the United States.

Business Lines 
Ferrovial operates through four divisions:

Highways

Through its subsidiary Cintra, Ferrovial is dedicated to the promotion and management of more than 20 highways with over 1,500 kilometers in 9 countries.

In Spain, it operates the Autema highway concession, A66, and the Autopista del Sol (E15), as well as the SerranoPark car park in Madrid.

In Portugal, it owns a share in the Scut Açores highway. In Canada and the United States, it operates highways under a barrier-free toll system, including the 407 ETR, the 407 East Phase 2, and the 407 EDG highways (Toronto), the LBJ Expressway, the North Tarrant Express and NTE Extension (Dallas), and I-77 (North Carolina).

In European countries, Ferrovial has a share in the M3 and M4 highways in Ireland, and it's carrying out the M8 improvement project in Scotland.

In 2015, the group increased its profit by 80% to €720 million, following the sale and deconsolidation of highways.

Airports
Ferrovial's first foray into private airport management was with the purchase of a share in the Mexican company Aeropuertos del Sureste in 1998. Since then, Ferrovial has managed different airports around the world.

With the acquisition of BAA in 2006, now called Heathrow Airport Holdings (HAH), it went on to manage seven airports in the United Kingdom: Heathrow, Gatwick, Stansted, Southampton, Aberdeen, Glasgow and Edinburgh. It also acquired two airports in Europe in Naples and Budapest, which it would later sell. Following the British Competition Commission's decision, Ferrovial sold Gatwick Airport in 2009, announced the sale of Edinburgh Airport in April 2012, and put the Stansted airport up for sale in August of the same year.

Ferrovial currently operates four airports in the United Kingdom: Heathrow, Southampton, Glasgow, and Aberdeen.

At the beginning of 2021, Ferrovial Airports announced its foray into the urban air mobility (UAM) and advanced air mobility (AAM) business through the construction and design of vertiports, the infrastructures needed by eVTOLs. Currently, Ferrovial has announced its plans for the development of vertiport networks in Spain, the United Kingdom, and the United States.

In 2022, Ferrovial Airports reached an agreement with the Turkish infrastructure company YDA Group for the acquisition of a 60% stake in the company that manages the concession of Dalaman International Airport in Turkey.

Construction
The company's construction division, which was called Ferrovial Agroman until 2020, is now Ferrovial Construction, and has been involved in the following major projects:
the Guggenheim Museum Bilbao in Spain completed in 1997
Terminal 4 at Madrid–Barajas Airport in Spain, completed in 2006	
Marqués de Riscal Hotel in Spain, completed in 2006
CaixaForum Madrid in Spain, completed in 2007
Viaducto de Montabliz in Spain, completed in 2008
M3 motorway in Ireland, completed in 2010	
Málaga Airport Terminal 3 in Spain, completed in 2010
SCUT Azores Highway in the Azores, completed in 2011
Heathrow T2A Terminal in England, completed in 2014
Farringdon Station in the United Kingdom, completed in 2018

Construction subsidiaries 
Webber in the USA
Budimex in Poland
Cadagua

Mobility and Energy Infrastructure 
Ferrovial Mobility and Energy Infrastructures promote the transition to a sustainable and clean economy and are involved in projects such as offshore wind farms.

Services 
In 2021, Ferrovial Services' infrastructure services area in Spain was sold to Portobello, and it came to an agreement with PreZero, a Schwarz Group company, on closing the sale of its Environmental business in Spain and Portugal. This division was in charge of the maintenance and conservation of infrastructures and services, as well as managing urban and environmental services. It has the following international subsidiaries:

 Broadspectrum in Australia and New Zealand was acquired in May 2016; it is dedicated to services in the area of transportation, urban infrastructure, natural resources, and provisions for public administrations.

 Amey in the United Kingdom engaged in infrastructure maintenance and facility and waste management. The British subsidiary will manage 370 kilometers of highways in the United Kingdom.

 Steel Ferrovial Services provides mining services in Chile.

Global presence 
Ferrovial has a presence in the following countries:

Spain
Ferrovial Construction (formerly Ferrovial Agroman)
Cadagua: water treatment
Highways Cintra

United States
Highways: NTE, LBJ, I-77, I-66
Construction: Ferrovial Construction and Webber

Canada
Toll roads: 407 ETR

Poland
Construction: Budimex
Services: FBSerwis SA

Australia and New Zealand
Ferrovial Construction

Chile
Construction: Line 6 and 3 of the Santiago de Chile Metro

United Kingdom
Airports: Heathrow (25%), Aberdeen, Glasgow, and Southampton (50%)
Services: Amey
Construction: Ferrovial Construction

Colombia 

 Construction and Highways: Ruta del Cacao

Peru 

 Construction: Lima Airport control tower

Slovakia 

 Construction and Highways: D4-R7 Highway

Portugal 

 Construction

 Cintra

Sustainability 
Ferrovial has been recognized by global entities for its sustainable practices.

 Dow Jones: Since 2002, it has been listed on the index of the most sustainable companies in the world.
 FTSE4Good: Ferrovial has been on the FTSE4Good Global Index since 2004.
 Carbon Disclosure Project: ranked among the companies with the best practices in reducing carbon emissions.
 MSCI Global Sustainability Index: "A" rating. Through the analysis carried out by its research department, MSCI Research, it uses information to make investments with sustainable criteria.
 GRESB: rating of 87 out of 100. We're also part of the GLIO/GRESB ESG Index.

Criticism

The Palau Case 
As part of the Palau Case investigation, Anti-Corruption discovered "sufficient evidence” of Ferrovial Agroman paying illicit commissions to the Democratic Convergence of Catalonia (CDC) party through the Palau de la Música Catalana to ensure that public works such as the City of Justice and the unfinished line 9 of the Barcelona Metro station would be awarded to them.

On January 15, 2018, the Provincial Court of Barcelona issued a judgment in the Palau Case, acquitting the two executives related to Ferrovial Agroman. The prosecution appealed that acquittal, but the appeal was dismissed by the Supreme Court.

References

External links

 Official website
 Official website

 
Spanish brands
Real estate companies of Spain
Multinational companies headquartered in Spain
Companies based in Madrid
Conglomerate companies of Spain
Construction and civil engineering companies established in 1952
IBEX 35
Companies listed on the Madrid Stock Exchange
Spanish companies established in 1952